Trash Fashion are a four-piece band made up of brothers Tom Marsh and Ben Marsh (lead vocals and lead guitar, respectively) joined by Matt Emerson (as drummer) and Jim Ready (as bassist). Their current UK record label is Propaganda Records and in Japan it is Vinyl Junkie. All members originally hail from Birmingham and are now based in London.

Members

In early 2009, the band replaced their previous stage names (shown in brackets) with their real-life first names on their MySpace.

 Tom Marsh ("Jet Storm") — keyboards, lead vocals
 Ben Marsh ("Mason Storm") — guitar, vocals
 Matt Emerson ("Bam Bam") — drums
 Jim Ready ("Jimbo Ready") — bass

Former members
K-Bomb left the band in May 2008 to pursue his solo project, Kurran and the Wolfnotes .

Musical style
Trash Fashion describe their sound as "Guntronic Disco Warehouse Rock" but are often placed in the New Rave category, citing Black Strobe, Tiga, Daft Punk, Altern8, The Prodigy, Shalamar, Prince, Stevie Wonder, and Iron Maiden as some of their influences.

Trash Fashion also cover songs from established bands, such as Madness  and Hall & Oates .

Discography

Albums
Nights of Error (album) (Released 20-10-2008), Propaganda Records
 Beat Goes Round
 Why Can't We Be Friends
 We Go To War
 Spread the Love
 Night of Error
 Rabbit in the Headlights
 Mom and Daddy
 Rave Dave
 I Got Slimed
 Tight Body
 Uphill Struggle
 What Am I Supposed To Do
Eat our Skill (Japan only mini-album) (Released 4-6-2008), Vinyl Junkie

EPs
I can't go for that (Released 2009)
Why Can't We Be Friends? (Released 10-3-2008)
Mom & Daddy (2007)

Singles

References

External links
Official Website
Trash Fashion on Last FM
'Rave Dog - a documentary about Trash fashion and New Rave on FourDocs'

Musical groups established in 2005